Tieut (character: ㅌ) is a consonant of the Korean hangul alphabet. The Unicode for ㅌ is U+314C. It is pronounced aspirated, as [th] at the beginning of a syllable and as [t] at the end of a syllable. For example: 토마토 tomato [thomatho] but 붙다 butta ("to stick to"), where it is pronounced with an unaspirated [t] sound.

Stroke order

References 

Hangul jamo